Frank the Pug is a fictional character from the Men in Black franchise, first seen in the 1997 film. He has also appeared in the 2002 sequel, 2019 spin-off, the animated series and the video game MIB: Alien Crisis. Within the films, Frank has the appearance of a normal pug dog, but he is actually an extraterrestrial in disguise (a Remoolian). Frank was raised by Ted Brac who trained him for all his acting roles. Frank is played in the first two films by a trained pug named Mushu, with Tim Blaney providing his voice in the  films and the video game. In the animated series, the voice is provided by Eddie Barth.

Men in Black
In the first film, Frank the Pug appears at a small kiosk next to an odd-looking man selling keys. His first line is spoken when J (who only knows he's here to meet an alien in disguise) says "Now that's the worst disguise ever", referring to the man. Frank replies "If you don't like it, you can kiss my furry little butt!" Agent J is shocked to discover that the alien is Frank. In the film, Frank acts as an informant for MiB, providing Agent K information on a "galaxy" referred to by the Arquillians. Frank reveals that the galaxy is on Earth and is a vast power source that has the potential to wipe out the Arquillians if their enemies, the Bugs, find it. Frank also points out that humans must learn to understand the notion of scope in the universe; i.e. a very important and grand thing can be very small.

Men in Black: The Series
Frank appeared in a few episodes of Men in Black: The Series with virtually the same role as the first film. The man in the kiosk is different from the one in the first movie as he is revealed to be a robot in which Frank presses a button to make him talk ("Make it snappy, we're closing here!"), this may also apply to the one from the first movie since he doesn't appear to move that much. Humorously, Frank's true alien form still resembles a pug, albeit with a dark green color, antennae, and a 3-pointed tail; however, the series is usually not considered canon, due to the release of Men in Black II. Frank is often shown denouncing his suit; Frank eventually replaced it with a similar suit, with minor cosmetic differences. The series also revealed Frank was once cell mates with the mentally-unstable Drekk.

Men in Black II
In the second film, Frank was given a bigger role as director Barry Sonnenfeld enjoyed the dog's performance in the first film. In this film, he appears to be an employee at MIB HQ. He first appears while delivering passports to Chief Zed's office. Zed is speaking with Agent J about a killing that he wants him and Agent T (Patrick Warburton) to investigate, but Agent J informs him that he had neuralyzed Agent T. Frank then volunteers to be J's new partner. Frank, now known as "Agent F" and wearing an MIB uniform, soon becomes a nuisance to J as he doesn't feel he needs a partner and Frank never stops talking. Frank sings a few lines of "I Will Survive" by Gloria Gaynor as he rides with J to the scene of the crime (Tim Blaney as Frank sings the song, slightly altered, in its entirety on the film's soundtrack). When the two agents arrive, he notices the "suit" that the dead alien was wearing and says "Hey, J, zero percent body fat". After J has talked with the witness, he can be seen barking to the song "Who Let the Dogs Out?" before he is interrupted by J. J and Frank were later dispatched to Central Park to investigate a ship. 

When one of his fellow agents was laughing about Frank being J's new partner, Frank attacked the Agent (implied to be at the groin). When Agent K is taken to be deneuralyzed, Frank steps down as Agent J's partner, but becomes Chief Zed's personal assistant, partly because the job offers better dental. He communicates with J about the situation within MIB while trapped in the base but is found by Serleena who imitates his voice to try to trap J and K. In his penultimate scene in the movie, he identifies himself as a Remoolian. He at the end of the film says "Woah" after Agent K showed him and J, that Earth and the Human race are stored in a locker at an Alien Space Station modeled after Grand Central Terminal.

Frank also appears in the film's promotional music video "Black Suits Comin' (Nod Ya Head)" in which he literally pulls the plug on Will Smith's performance.

MIB: Alien Crisis
Frank the Pug is featured as a character, and on the cover art for the video game MIB: Alien Crisis. With J and K missing, Frank is working with Agent C, who has recently moved into fieldwork from administration to prove herself, and new MiB deputy Agent P, an art thief who was recruited after he showed exceptional skill in dealing with an alien ambush to prevent Earth from being caught up in a civil war.

Men in Black 3
Frank does not appear in person in the third film, but can be seen in a picture in J's room. Additionally when J is being pulled over by two police officers in 1969, Frank appears on a Coney Island billboard where he is advertised as "The Incredible Speaking Pug". Frank was excluded from the film because Mushu the dog had died, but he appears in the Men in Black III App game as Agent F and serves as the player's partner.

MIB: International
Frank the Pug returns in a cameo in Men in Black: International, guarding the entrance to MIB's New York HQ. He picks out Molly Wright (Tessa Thompson), who is posing as an MIB agent, and lets her through down to headquarters before calling in the intrusion.

References 

Men in Black (franchise)
Animal characters in films
Animal characters in television
Extraterrestrial characters in films
Extraterrestrial characters in television
Fictional dogs
Fictional alien hunters
Fictional members of secret societies
Fictional paranormal investigators
Fictional secret agents and spies
Film characters introduced in 1997
Film sidekicks
Sony Pictures characters
Television sidekicks